Yıldız Park is a historical, urban park in Beşiktaş district of Istanbul, Turkey. It is one of the largest public parks in Istanbul. The park is located in Yıldız quarter between the palaces of Yıldız and Çırağan.

History

Yıldız Park was once part of the imperial garden of Yıldız Palace. Extending down the slopes from the palace, this walled park was reserved only for palace dwellers during the reign of Sultan Abdulhamid II.

The area of Yıldız used to be a forest in Byzantine times. Starting during the reign of Suleiman the Magnificent, the sultans made it their hunting grounds. In the next centuries, it remained as a grove behind the seaside palaces. The neighbourhood began to flourish in the wake of construction of the palace in the 19th century. It took its name from the first pavilion, namely Yıldız Kasrı, commissioned by Selim III in early 19th century.

The  of the palace's external garden were surrounded by high walls and detached from a grove during the reign of Abdulhamid II in the 19th century. A small artificial lake, pavilions, summer houses and a porcelain factory were established in this section.

Today

Currently Yıldız Park is a beautiful garden complex with set in a very large park of flowers, plants and trees, gathered from every part of the world dating from the Ottoman era. Park grounds offer panoramic views of the Bosphorus. The park is a popular picnic place especially for the weekends. Two beautiful old pavilions, namely Çadır and Malta pavilions, are used to rest, drink tea, eat breakfast and have lunch.

The park is separated into two sections, the outer section is open to the public and comprises the Şale, Çadır and Malta pavilions and the still-operating Yıldız porcelain factory. The vegetation of the park includes magnolia, bay leaves, Judas trees, silver limes and horse-chestnuts. Furthermore, the park shelters oak, cypress, pine, yew, cedar and ash trees. Besides, the outer section has two man-made lakes.

Gallery

See also
 Yıldız Clock Tower

References
 Governorate of Istanbul official website - Yıldız Palace and Park

External links

 Planetware.com  - Yıldız Park
 YildizParki.com  - Istanbul Yıldız Parkı

Parks in Istanbul
Park
Beşiktaş
Urban public parks